Walram III may refer to:

 Waleran III, Duke of Limburg (1355–1415) 
 Walram III of Nassau-Wiesbaden, son of Adolf, King of Germany